The Imperial Seal of Korea or Ihwamun was one of the symbols of the Korean Empire. It was originally the emblem of the royal family and was subsequently used for the coat of arms of the short-lived empire. The symbol features a plum flower (Ihwa). Plum blossoms commonly known as the Maehwa, signals the beginning of spring in Korea (When spring blooms in Korea, 2021). Plum blossom was taken to symbolize courage in the face of hardship, especially in something so physically delicate, and has been long admired by the Korean and Chinese literati (Sunglim Kim, 2018). As the Plum tree blossoms between two seasons, it is also seen as a symbol of spring - bringing warmth, transition and the promise of fruitfulness (Every plum tree has a story, 2022).  Since ancient times, plum blossom has been filled with meaning and mystery. Plum blossoms bloom at the end of the winter, and because of this, they are called the herald of spring. They also symbolize perseverance because of how they can possibly bloom during the cold winter. Since they are considered the first flower of the year, they also represent purity and renewal. Plum flowers are supposed to have five petals. Its five petals are believed to carry 5 different blessings such as: wealth, health, virtue, peaceful and natural death (Plum Blossoms, Its symbolism and meanings, 2021).

The Imperial Seal of Korea first represented the Jeonju Yi clan. The Jeonju Yi clan symbol came into play as one of the symbol of the royals when the King Taejo, of the Jeonju clan of Yi, ascended the throne in a coup d'etat against King U of the Goryeo Dynasty. An accomplished military strategist and renowned commander Taejo had distinguished himself by repelling the marauding Wokou. Taejo took control of Goryeo until July 1392, formally renaming the Goryeo the "Kingdom of Great Joseon" by taking the throne (Joseon Dynasty, 2022). Jeonju Yi clan symbol became the imperial seal of Korea when the Japanese assassinated King Gojong’s anti-Japanese queen, Empress Myeongseong. Fearing for his life, Gojong fled to the Russian Legation, where he spent a whole year. In 1897, Gojong left the legation and took up residence at Deoksugung, where he declared the Daehan Empire (Korean Empire), with himself as Emperor Gwangmu (Seth, 2016). Gojong changed the Jeonju Yi clan symbol to the Imperial Seal of Korea. Today, the seal is used as a symbol by the families' association of the Jeonju Yi clan, which was the royal family of Joseon dynasty and the imperial family of the Korean Empire.

See also 
 Emblem of South Korea
 Imperial Seal of Japan
 Imperial Seal of Manchukuo

References 
1. Sunglim Kim. (2018). Flowering Plums and Curio Cabinets : The Culture of Objects in Late Chosŏn Korean Art. University of Washington Press.

2. Seth, M. J. (2016). Routledge Handbook of Modern Korean History. Routledge/Taylor & Francis Group. 

3. Every plum tree has a story... The Present Tree. (n.d.). Retrieved May 4, 2022, from https://thepresenttree.com/blogs/tree-meanings/plum-tree-meaning 

6. When spring blooms in Korea. Talk Talk KOREA. (n.d.). Retrieved May 4, 2022, from https://www.korea.net/TalkTalkKorea/French/community/community/CMN0000006536#:~:text=Plum%20blossoms%2C%20commonly%20known%20as,a%20strong%20but%20sweet%20fragrance. 

Korea
National symbols of Korea
Korea
Korean monarchy
Korean Empire
Korean heraldry